Monmore Green railway station was a railway station built by the London and North Western Railway on their Stour Valley Line in 1863. It served the Monmore Green area of Wolverhampton, and was located near to the junction of Bilston Road and Landport Road.

The station closed in 1916, although the Rugby-Birmingham-Stafford Line loop from the West Coast Main Line still runs through the site of the station today. As you pass along this stretch of track, the exact position of the station is coincident with a widening of the track-side paraphernalia, most defined on the eastern track edge.

References

Disused railway stations in Wolverhampton
Former London and North Western Railway stations
Railway stations in Great Britain opened in 1863
Railway stations in Great Britain closed in 1916